is a railway station on the  Nanao Line in the city of Nanao, Ishikawa, Japan, operated by the private railway operator Noto Railway.

Lines

Station layout
The station consists of one ground-level side platform serving a single bi-directional track. The station is unattended.

History
Kasashiho Station opened on 31 October 1928. With the privatization of Japanese National Railways (JNR) on 1 April 1987, the station came under the control of JR West. On 1 September 1991, the section of the Nanao Line from Nanao to Anamizu was separated from JR West into the Noto Railway.

Surrounding area
 Kasashiho Post Office

See also
 List of railway stations in Japan

External links

 

Railway stations in Ishikawa Prefecture
Railway stations in Japan opened in 1928
Nanao Line
Nanao, Ishikawa